The Winchester Star is  a daily newspaper (Monday-Friday) based in Winchester, Virginia covering the Shenandoah Valley area. Subscribers may choose from either the print edition or a downloadable edition of the newspaper.

On March 6, 2018, it was announced that The Winchester Star, along with the other Byrd family newspapers, were to be sold to Ogden Newspapers. Members of the Byrd family had been the sole owners of The Winchester Star since 1897.

References

External links
 

Daily newspapers published in Virginia
Winchester, Virginia
Newspapers established in 1896
1896 establishments in Virginia